Fajrabad (also Romanized as Fajrābād; also known as Gorgābād) is a village in Oshnavieh-ye Shomali Rural District, in the Central District of Oshnavieh County, West Azerbaijan Province, Iran. At the time of the 2006 census, its population was 349 people in 60 families.

References 

Populated places in Oshnavieh County